Jerningham is an English surname. Notable people with the surname include:

Jerningham Wakefield (1820–1879), the only son of Edward Gibbon Wakefield
Henry Jerningham (1512–1572), English courtier during the reigns of Henry VIII, Edward VI, Mary I and Elizabeth I
Henry Stafford-Jerningham, 9th Baron Stafford (1802–1884), British peer and politician
Hubert Jerningham, KCMG, DL (1842–1914), British Liberal Party politician and Governor of Trinidad and Tobago 1897–1900

See also
Jerningham Baronets, of Cossey in the County of Norfolk, was a title in the Baronetage of England